Making the Grade may refer to:
Making the Grade (1929 film), an American comedy film
Making the Grade (TV series), a 1982 American television series
Making the Grade (1984 film), an American teen comedy film
"Making the Grade!", a 1989 episode of The Raccoons
Making the Grade (album), a 2002 album by Diffuser
"Making the Grade", a 2006 episode of My Gym Partner's a Monkey
Making the Grade: The Economic Evolution of American School Districts